Owain Sebastian Yeoman is a Welsh actor. His credits include The Nine, Kitchen Confidential, AMC's Turn (as Benedict Arnold) and the HBO series Generation Kill. Additionally, he portrayed CBI Agent Wayne Rigsby in The Mentalist and portrayed Benny Gallagher in Emergence.

Early life
Yeoman was born and raised in Chepstow, Monmouthshire, Wales, where his parents, Michael and Hilary, still live.  He attended Wantage CofE Primary School before attending school at Wyedean School in Sedbury, Gloucestershire, where he showed a keen interest in English language, English literature and was involved in the school's amateur dramatics productions.

He studied English literature at Oxford University as a member of Brasenose College, and graduated BA, which matured into an MA. In those years he was a member of the OUDS and Oxford Revue. He had planned to continue doctoral studies but was not able to secure a grant. Instead he worked for a time at a bank in Canary Wharf, London before enrolling at the Royal Academy of Dramatic Art to study acting.

Career
Yeoman made his film debut as Lysander in the Oscar nominated film Troy. He also had a small part in Broken Lizard's film, Beerfest, and made a guest appearance on an episode of Midsomer Murders entitled “Dead in the Water”. He played Sgt. Eric Kocher in the HBO miniseries, Generation Kill (2008). He played the major villain, a T-888 model cyborg Terminator named "Cromartie", in the pilot episode of Terminator: The Sarah Connor Chronicles. The role was taken by Garret Dillahunt in the series of the same name.

Yeoman played Wayne Rigsby in The Mentalist. He starred in every episode to the sixth season, alongside Simon Baker, Robin Tunney, Amanda Righetti and Tim Kang. He also starred in ChromeSkull: Laid to Rest 2. In 2013 it was confirmed that Yeoman and Righetti were leaving The Mentalist after the sixth season. He guest starred in two episodes (10 & 11) of Extant in 2014.

Yeoman also had a small role in the American drama American Sniper, his first major breakthrough on the big screen. From 2015 to 2017, he portrayed General Benedict Arnold in seasons 2-4 of the TV series Turn: Washington's Spies. Yeoman portrayed Vartox on the pilot of DC Comics TV series Supergirl.

Personal life

Yeoman was married to actress Lucy Davis from December 2006 to October 2011. His first marriage took place at St Paul's Cathedral, London. Davis and Yeoman were permitted to marry there as her father Robert (better known by his stage name Jasper Carrott) had been awarded an OBE in the New Year's Honours in 2002. On 7 September 2013, Yeoman married jewellery designer Gigi Yallouz at a private estate in Malibu, California. They have one daughter named Ever Belle. 

Yeoman is a vegetarian and was photographed for PETA's vegetarianism campaign.

Filmography

Film

Television

References

External links

Agency profile

1978 births
Living people
People from Chepstow
Alumni of Brasenose College, Oxford
Alumni of RADA
Welsh male film actors
Welsh male television actors
Welsh male voice actors
Welsh expatriates in the United States